Jim Maguire (2 November 1918 – 26 April 1990) was an  Australian rules footballer who played with Hawthorn in the Victorian Football League (VFL).

Notes

External links 

1918 births
1990 deaths
Australian rules footballers from Victoria (Australia)
Hawthorn Football Club players
Terang Football Club players